Minenhle Lethuxolo Mthethwa (born 5 August 1991) is a South African professional rugby union player who most recently played with the . He usually plays as a winger, but can also play as an outside centre.

Rugby career

Youth rugby

Mthethwa was born in Empangeni, and went to school in Eshowe. However, he was never selected to represent his local KwaZulu-Natal province at any national tournaments at schoolboy level.

University of the Western Cape

Mthethwa moved to Cape Town, where he enrolled at the University of the Western Cape, establishing himself in their first team. He was included in their rugby team that participated in the 2013 Varsity Shield. He made a total of five appearances for his team during the regular season, helping them to second spot on the log to qualify for the final against . He also started the final, but could not prevent the side from Bloemfontein winning 29–19 to win the competition.

Mthethwa was a key player for the team in the 2014 Varsity Shield, starting seven of their eight matches. He scored tries in matches against ,  and  – the second-highest try tally for a UWC player behind James Verity-Amm – in a disappointing season for UWC, which saw them finish fourth in the five-team competition, winning just three of their matches.

He featured in all eight of their matches during the round-robin stage of the 2016 Varsity Shield. He scored a single try in their 30–5 victory over the UFH Blues, as UWC finishing in second place on the log after  had twelve points deducted for fielding an ineligible player in their matches. Mthethwa started the final, where UWC again ended on the losing side, with  winning the match 39–2, and also started in a promotion play-off match against fellow Cape Town team . UWC lost the match 5–40 to remain in the Varsity Shield for 2017.

Eastern Province Kings

The Eastern Province Kings endured a torrid season, losing all eight of their matches to finish bottom of the log.

References

South African rugby union players
Living people
1991 births
People from Empangeni
Rugby union centres
Rugby union wings
Eastern Province Elephants players
Rugby union players from KwaZulu-Natal